John Golafre (died 1442) was an English courtier and Member of Parliament.

He was born the only son of Thomas Golafre of Radley Manor in Berkshire (now Oxfordshire). An uncle was Sir John Brocas, Master of the King's Horse. A cousin, Sir John Golafre, was a close friend of the king.

By 1395 he had secured a position at the court of Richard II. By 1396 he had inherited the extensive estates of his uncle, another Sir John Golafre. In 1406 he gained possession of Fyfield Manor in Berkshire (now Oxfordshire), which he made his home.

In 1397 he was appointed Sheriff of Oxfordshire and Berkshire. He was also that year elected as a Knight of the Shire (MP) for Oxfordshire. In 1399 he was briefly imprisoned by Henry IV for his support of King Richard but in 1404 was reappointed sheriff. He was afterwards appointed sheriff for 1414 and 1424. During much of this period he also served as a Justice of the Peace (JP) for Oxfordshire.

He was elected MP for Berkshire in 1401 and re-elected on another 11 occasions between then and 1429. He also served on a number of commissions and was tax controller (1404), escheator (1409–1410), controller and surveyor of Woodstock Palace (1413–1438) in Oxfordshire and verderer of Woodstock Park (1398 to his death in 1442).

He was amongst Henry V's army on his second French expedition in 1417 and was appointed Receiver-General of the Duchy of Normandy and all occupied France in 1418.

On his death in 1442 he was buried under a remarkable two-tier "memento mori" tomb in the Golafre chantry which he founded in St Nicholas' church, Fyfield. On the lower tier he is portrayed by a stone carving of a cadaver in an advanced state of decay with sunken eyes, taut neck and exposed ribs. On the upper tier he is presented in full plate armour.

He married three times: firstly Elizabeth, the daughter of Sir Edmund de la Pole of Boarstall Castle in Buckinghamshire, co-heiress of her mother, Elizabeth Handlo, and widow of Sir Ingram Bruyn of South Ockendon in Essex; secondly Nicola, the daughter and heiress of Thomas Devenish of Greatham in Hampshire and widow of John Englefield of Englefield House in Berkshire; and thirdly Margaret, the daughter of Sir John Heveningham, and widow of Sir Walter de la Pole of Dernford in Sawston, Cambridgeshire.

References

 

Date of birth unknown
1442 deaths
High Sheriffs of Oxfordshire
High Sheriffs of Berkshire
English MPs September 1397
English MPs 1401
People from Vale of White Horse (district)
People from Radley
English MPs October 1404
English MPs 1407
English MPs 1410
English MPs May 1413
English MPs April 1414
English MPs March 1416
English MPs May 1421
English MPs 1422
English MPs 1426
English MPs 1427
English MPs 1429
Members of the Parliament of England for Berkshire